Albert Cushing Read, Sr. (March 29, 1887 – October 10, 1967) was an aviator and Rear Admiral in the United States Navy. He and his crew made the first transatlantic flight in the NC-4, a Curtiss NC flying boat.

Early life and Atlantic crossing
Read was born in Lyme, New Hampshire on March 29, 1887 into a Boston Brahmin family.  He attended the United States Naval Academy at Annapolis, graduating in the class of 1907. In 1915, he was designated naval aviator number 24.

As a Lieutenant Commander in May 1919, Read commanded a crew of five on the NC-4 Curtiss flying boat, the first aircraft ever to make a transatlantic flight, a couple of weeks before Alcock and Brown's non-stop flight, and eight years before Charles Lindbergh's solo, non-stop flight. Read's flight started from Rockaway Beach, Long Island, took 23 days before arriving in Plymouth, England. The six stops included layovers at Trepassey Bay, Newfoundland, the Azores, and Lisbon, Portugal.

Later in 1919, upon returning to the U.S., Read predicted: "It soon will be possible to drive an airplane around the world at a height of 60,000 feet and 1,000 miles per hour." The next day, The New York Times ran an editorial in reaction, stating: "It is one thing to be a qualified aviator, and quite another to be a qualified prophet. Nothing now known supports the Lieutenant Commander’s forecast. An airplane at the height of 60,000 feet would be whirling its propellers in a vacuum, and no aviator could live long in the freezing cold of interstellar space."

On June 3, 1919, he was made a commander of the Order of the Tower and Sword by the Portuguese government. After returning to the United States, Read was awarded the Navy Distinguished Service Medal, which at the time was a more prestigious award than the Navy Cross that the other five NC-4 crew members received (the order of award precedence was switched in 1942). In 1929, Read and the rest of the flight crew of NC-4 were awarded Congressional Gold Medals.

Later life
On June 24, 1924, Commander Read assumed command of both  and the aircraft squadrons of the Asiatic Fleet.

Read trained naval aviators through World War II. He was nicknamed "Putty Read" because his face rarely showed any emotion.

On June 4, 1962, he appeared on the TV game show I've Got a Secret.

He died in retirement in Coconut Grove, Florida, on October 10, 1967. He is buried in Arlington National Cemetery with his wife Bess Burdine Read (1896–1992).

Read was inducted into the National Aviation Hall of Fame in 1965.

Awards
 Congressional Gold Medal
 Navy Distinguished Service Medal
 NC-4 Medal
 World War I Victory Medal
 American Defense Service Medal
 American Campaign Medal
 Commander of the Order of the Tower and Sword
 Air Force Cross (United Kingdom)
 World War II Victory Medal

References

Bibliography

 Cunningham, Charlie and Jackie. Putty and Bess. Alexandria,VA: Association of Naval Aviation, 1997.
 Albert C. Read and the NC-4 on early aviators site
 Commander Albert C. Read is congratulated by Secretary of the Navy Josephus Daniels and Assistant Secretary of the Navy Franklin Delano Roosevelt(standing on right) on June 30, 1919

External links
 Albert Read at ArlingtonCemetery.net, an unofficial website

1887 births
1967 deaths
People from Lyme, New Hampshire
Members of the Early Birds of Aviation
United States Navy rear admirals (upper half)
United States Naval Aviators
United States Naval Academy alumni
Recipients of the Legion of Merit
Burials at Arlington National Cemetery
United States Navy personnel of World War I
United States Navy World War II admirals
Aviation history of the United States
Recipients of the Air Force Cross (United Kingdom)
Recipients of the Order of the Tower and Sword
Congressional Gold Medal recipients
Cushing family